This Month in Taiwan, founded by E. Kirk Henderson and first published in 1974, is the most widely distributed tourism magazine in Taiwan, with an annual estimated circulation of 200,000 copies. The publishers authorizes advertisers or their agents to physically count and verify the quantity of magazines published at its printing plant at any time. This Month in Taiwan is distributed free of charge and available at leading hotels in Taiwan as well as in airports, clubs, government offices and other tourism-related locations.

Common topics covered by the magazine include:
 Tourist attractions
 Maps
 Hotel lists
 Nightlife in Taipei
 Art and culture
 Dining
 Associations and clubs
 Tourism offices
 Public transportation schedules

References

External links
 Official Website

1974 establishments in Taiwan
Free magazines
Magazines established in 1974
Magazines published in Taiwan
Monthly magazines
Tourism magazines